The Unecha Constituency (No.78) is a Russian legislative constituency in Bryansk Oblast. In 1993-2007 the constituency, named Pochep, included most of rural Bryansk Oblast west of Bryansk. In 2016 redistricting Pochepsky District was placed into Bryansk constituency and most of old Pochep constituency was relocated to northern Bryansk Oblast, gaining the name Unecha.

Members elected

Election results

1993

|-
! colspan=2 style="background-color:#E9E9E9;text-align:left;vertical-align:top;" |Candidate
! style="background-color:#E9E9E9;text-align:left;vertical-align:top;" |Party
! style="background-color:#E9E9E9;text-align:right;" |Votes
! style="background-color:#E9E9E9;text-align:right;" |%
|-
|style="background-color:"|
|align=left|Oleg Shenkaryov
|align=left|Communist Party
|
|33.24%
|-
|style="background-color:#78866B"|
|align=left|Vladimir Prudnikov
|align=left|Dignity and Charity
| -
|17.40%
|-
| colspan="5" style="background-color:#E9E9E9;"|
|- style="font-weight:bold"
| colspan="3" style="text-align:left;" | Total
| 
| 100%
|-
| colspan="5" style="background-color:#E9E9E9;"|
|- style="font-weight:bold"
| colspan="4" |Source:
|
|}

1995

|-
! colspan=2 style="background-color:#E9E9E9;text-align:left;vertical-align:top;" |Candidate
! style="background-color:#E9E9E9;text-align:left;vertical-align:top;" |Party
! style="background-color:#E9E9E9;text-align:right;" |Votes
! style="background-color:#E9E9E9;text-align:right;" |%
|-
|style="background-color:"|
|align=left|Oleg Shenkaryov (incumbent)
|align=left|Communist Party
|
|35.73%
|-
|style="background-color:"|
|align=left|Gennady Lemeshov
|align=left|Liberal Democratic Party
|
|18.26%
|-
|style="background-color:"|
|align=left|Ivan Nesterov
|align=left|Independent
|
|8.01%
|-
|style="background-color:#3C3E42"|
|align=left|Georgy Kondratyev
|align=left|Duma-96
|
|6.28%
|-
|style="background-color:"|
|align=left|Nadezhda Garbuzova
|align=left|Agrarian Party
|
|4.61%
|-
|style="background-color:#1C1A0D"|
|align=left|Vasily Kopylov
|align=left|Forward, Russia!
|
|4.56%
|-
|style="background-color:#3A46CE"|
|align=left|Lyudmila Komogortseva
|align=left|Democratic Choice of Russia – United Democrats
|
|3.60%
|-
|style="background-color:#23238E"|
|align=left|Aleksey Voronin
|align=left|Our Home – Russia
|
|3.56%
|-
|style="background-color:#F21A29"|
|align=left|Nikolay Yakubovich
|align=left|Trade Unions and Industrialists – Union of Labour
|
|3.46%
|-
|style="background-color:"|
|align=left|Vitaly Kozin
|align=left|Independent
|
|2.93%
|-
|style="background-color:"|
|align=left|Pyotr Gaponenko
|align=left|Independent
|
|1.62%
|-
|style="background-color:"|
|align=left|Sergey Akhremenko
|align=left|League of Independent Scientists
|
|0.90%
|-
|style="background-color:"|
|align=left|Stanislav Zhuravsky
|align=left|Independent
|
|0.76%
|-
|style="background-color:#000000"|
|colspan=2 |against all
|
|4.08%
|-
| colspan="5" style="background-color:#E9E9E9;"|
|- style="font-weight:bold"
| colspan="3" style="text-align:left;" | Total
| 
| 100%
|-
| colspan="5" style="background-color:#E9E9E9;"|
|- style="font-weight:bold"
| colspan="4" |Source:
|
|}

1999

|-
! colspan=2 style="background-color:#E9E9E9;text-align:left;vertical-align:top;" |Candidate
! style="background-color:#E9E9E9;text-align:left;vertical-align:top;" |Party
! style="background-color:#E9E9E9;text-align:right;" |Votes
! style="background-color:#E9E9E9;text-align:right;" |%
|-
|style="background-color:"|
|align=left|Pyotr Rogonov
|align=left|Communist Party
|
|43.58%
|-
|style="background-color:"|
|align=left|Ivan Nesterov
|align=left|Independent
|
|8.27%
|-
|style="background-color:"|
|align=left|Oleg Shenkaryov (incumbent)
|align=left|Independent
|
|8.13%
|-
|style="background-color:"|
|align=left|Nikolay Simonenko
|align=left|Independent
|
|6.90%
|-
|style="background-color:"|
|align=left|Nikolay Pozhilenkov
|align=left|Independent
|
|4.29%
|-
|style="background-color:"|
|align=left|Dmitry Kovalev
|align=left|Independent
|
|4.21%
|-
|style="background-color:#FF4400"|
|align=left|Valentin Parachev
|align=left|Andrey Nikolayev and Svyatoslav Fyodorov Bloc
|
|3.25%
|-
|style="background-color:"|
|align=left|Oleg Aniskov
|align=left|Independent
|
|2.33%
|-
|style="background-color:#23238E"|
|align=left|Igor Shchigolev
|align=left|Our Home – Russia
|
|1.75%
|-
|style="background-color:#020266"|
|align=left|Aleksandr Demidov
|align=left|Russian Socialist Party
|
|1.54%
|-
|style="background-color:#004BBC"|
|align=left|Mikhail Mamonov
|align=left|Russian Cause
|
|1.49%
|-
|style="background-color:"|
|align=left|Anatoly Shpuntov
|align=left|Independent
|
|1.13%
|-
|style="background-color:"|
|align=left|Aleksandr Tovkalo
|align=left|Independent
|
|1.10%
|-
|style="background-color:"|
|align=left|Valery Tarakanov
|align=left|Independent
|
|1.00%
|-
|style="background-color:"|
|align=left|Aleksandr Barsukov
|align=left|Independent
|
|0.65%
|-
|style="background-color:#000000"|
|colspan=2 |against all
|
|8.46%
|-
| colspan="5" style="background-color:#E9E9E9;"|
|- style="font-weight:bold"
| colspan="3" style="text-align:left;" | Total
| 
| 100%
|-
| colspan="5" style="background-color:#E9E9E9;"|
|- style="font-weight:bold"
| colspan="4" |Source:
|
|}

2003

|-
! colspan=2 style="background-color:#E9E9E9;text-align:left;vertical-align:top;" |Candidate
! style="background-color:#E9E9E9;text-align:left;vertical-align:top;" |Party
! style="background-color:#E9E9E9;text-align:right;" |Votes
! style="background-color:#E9E9E9;text-align:right;" |%
|-
|style="background-color:"|
|align=left|Vasily Semenkov
|align=left|United Russia
|
|36.11%
|-
|style="background-color:"|
|align=left|Pyotr Rogonov (incumbent)
|align=left|Communist Party
|
|28.00%
|-
|style="background-color:"|
|align=left|Lidia Blokhina
|align=left|Independent
|
|6.81%
|-
|style="background-color:#00A1FF"|
|align=left|Andrey Bocharov
|align=left|Party of Russia's Rebirth-Russian Party of Life
|
|5.91%
|-
|style="background-color:"|
|align=left|Nikolay Zhdanov-Lutsenko
|align=left|Liberal Democratic Party
|
|4.10%
|-
|style="background-color:"|
|align=left|Oleg Shenkaryov
|align=left|People's Party
|
|3.30%
|-
|style="background-color:"|
|align=left|Vasily Popik
|align=left|Independent
|
|2.93%
|-
|style="background-color:"|
|align=left|Aleksandr Bobkov
|align=left|Agrarian Party
|
|2.75%
|-
|style="background-color:#164C8C"|
|align=left|Nina Moganova
|align=left|United Russian Party Rus'
|
|0.60%
|-
|style="background-color:#000000"|
|colspan=2 |against all
|
|7.38%
|-
| colspan="5" style="background-color:#E9E9E9;"|
|- style="font-weight:bold"
| colspan="3" style="text-align:left;" | Total
| 
| 100%
|-
| colspan="5" style="background-color:#E9E9E9;"|
|- style="font-weight:bold"
| colspan="4" |Source:
|
|}

2016

|-
! colspan=2 style="background-color:#E9E9E9;text-align:left;vertical-align:top;" |Candidate
! style="background-color:#E9E9E9;text-align:left;vertical-align:top;" |Party
! style="background-color:#E9E9E9;text-align:right;" |Votes
! style="background-color:#E9E9E9;text-align:right;" |%
|-
|style="background-color:"|
|align=left|Valentina Mironova
|align=left|United Russia
|
|60.03%
|-
|style="background-color:"|
|align=left|Andrey Arkhitsky
|align=left|Communist Party
|
|12.43%
|-
|style="background-color:"|
|align=left|Viktor Kiselyov
|align=left|Liberal Democratic Party
|
|9.87%
|-
|style="background-color:"|
|align=left|Ivan Medved
|align=left|Rodina
|
|7.24%
|-
|style="background:"| 
|align=left|Aleksandr Medvedkov
|align=left|A Just Russia
|
|3.86%
|-
|style="background:"| 
|align=left|Olga Makhotina
|align=left|Yabloko
|
|1.93%
|-
|style="background:"| 
|align=left|Sergey Gorelov
|align=left|Party of Growth
|
|1.43%
|-
|style="background:"| 
|align=left|Vadim Kanichev
|align=left|Patriots of Russia
|
|1.06%
|-
| colspan="5" style="background-color:#E9E9E9;"|
|- style="font-weight:bold"
| colspan="3" style="text-align:left;" | Total
| 
| 100%
|-
| colspan="5" style="background-color:#E9E9E9;"|
|- style="font-weight:bold"
| colspan="4" |Source:
|
|}

2021

|-
! colspan=2 style="background-color:#E9E9E9;text-align:left;vertical-align:top;" |Candidate
! style="background-color:#E9E9E9;text-align:left;vertical-align:top;" |Party
! style="background-color:#E9E9E9;text-align:right;" |Votes
! style="background-color:#E9E9E9;text-align:right;" |%
|-
|style="background-color:"|
|align=left|Nikolay Alekseyenko
|align=left|United Russia
|
|57.73%
|-
|style="background-color:"|
|align=left|Andrey Arkhitsky
|align=left|Communist Party
|
|16.19%
|-
|style="background-color: " |
|align=left|Vitaly Minakov
|align=left|A Just Russia — For Truth
|
|12.28%
|-
|style="background-color:"|
|align=left|Roman Romanyuk
|align=left|Liberal Democratic Party
|
|3.41%
|-
|style="background-color: "|
|align=left|Viktor Grinkevich
|align=left|Rodina
|
|2.79%
|-
|style="background-color: "|
|align=left|Aleksandr Feskov
|align=left|Party of Pensioners
|
|1.92%
|-
|style="background-color: "|
|align=left|Aleksey Shcherbenko
|align=left|New People
|
|1.59%
|-
|style="background-color: "|
|align=left|Olga Makhotina
|align=left|Yabloko
|
|1.54%
|-
|style="background-color: "|
|align=left|Aleksey Nazarov
|align=left|Party of Growth
|
|0.83%
|-
| colspan="5" style="background-color:#E9E9E9;"|
|- style="font-weight:bold"
| colspan="3" style="text-align:left;" | Total
| 
| 100%
|-
| colspan="5" style="background-color:#E9E9E9;"|
|- style="font-weight:bold"
| colspan="4" |Source:
|
|}

Notes

References

Russian legislative constituencies
Politics of Bryansk Oblast